Abner Lacock (July 9, 1770April 12, 1837) was an American surveyor, civil engineer, and politician from Rochester, Pennsylvania. He served in both houses in the state legislature and represented Pennsylvania in both the U.S. House and Senate.

Biography

Abner Lacock was born on July 7, 1770, near Alexandria in the Colony of Virginia. He moved with his parents to Washington County, Pennsylvania, as a youth. In 1796 he moved to Beaver, Pennsylvania. He was a justice of the peace in 1796. He also worked as an innkeeper. He served in the Pennsylvania State Legislature from 1801 to 1803. He was an associate judge of the Beaver County Court from 1803 to 1804. He served again in the State legislature from 1804 to 1808. He was member of the Pennsylvania Militia and served as brigadier general in 1807. He was a member of the Pennsylvania State Senate from 1808 to 1810.

Lacock was elected as a Democratic Republican to the Twelfth Congress. He was re-elected to the Thirteenth Congress but resigned before it commenced, having been elected Senator. He was elected to the United States Senate as a Democratic Republican in 1812. He served as chairman of the United States Senate Committee on Pensions during the Fifteenth Congress. After he left Congress, he was appointed a State commissioner to survey routes for canals and railways in Pennsylvania in 1825. He again served in the State legislature from 1832 to 1835. He was appointed to survey and construct the Pennsylvania & Ohio Canal in 1836. He died near Freedom, Pennsylvania, in 1837. Interment in Lacock Cemetery in Rochester, Pennsylvania.

Abner was frequently referred to as General Lacock after he served as a brigadier general in the state militia.

External links

The Political Graveyard

1770 births
1837 deaths
Members of the Pennsylvania House of Representatives
Pennsylvania state senators
United States senators from Pennsylvania
Democratic-Republican Party United States senators
American surveyors
American civil engineers
Politicians from Alexandria, Virginia
People from Beaver, Pennsylvania
Democratic-Republican Party members of the United States House of Representatives from Pennsylvania
Engineers from Virginia
Engineers from Pennsylvania
19th-century American politicians